The following is an alphabetical list of members of the United States House of Representatives from the state of North Dakota.  For chronological tables of members of both houses of the United States Congress from the state (through the present day), see United States congressional delegations from North Dakota.  The list of names should be complete (as of January 3, 2015), but other data may be incomplete. It includes members who have represented only the state both past and present, as the Dakota Territory encompassed in addition South Dakota, and parts of present-day Wyoming, Montana, and Idaho.

Current member

Updated January 2019.

 : Kelly Armstrong (R) (since 2019)

List of members

See also

List of United States senators from North Dakota
United States congressional delegations from North Dakota
North Dakota's congressional districts

References

North Dakota
 
United States representatives